Abd al-Razzaq Beg Donboli (1762/3 – 1827/8) was an Iranian literary biographer, poet, and historian active during the early Qajar period. He belonged to the Donboli, a Turkic-speaking Kurdish tribe, which played a leading role in the areas of Khoy and Salmas in Azerbaijan, northern Iran.

References

Sources

Further reading 
 

18th-century Iranian writers
19th-century Iranian writers
People of the Zand dynasty
Donboli tribe
People of Qajar Iran
1760s births
1820s deaths
Year of birth uncertain
Year of death uncertain
18th-century Kurdish people